The N-320 is a road in eastern Spain.  It starts north of Albacete with a junction on the Autovía A-31.  It heads north across the River Jucar. The road crosses the Autovía A-3 before entering wooded hills.

The road comes to Cuenca where it meets the N-420 and the Autovía A-40 which is being  constructed.  The N-320 continues north along the western flanks of the forested Serrania de Cuenca.  The road turns west to cross the Mar de Castilla a major reservoir.  It then passes through the mountains of La Alcarria and into the plain of Madrid.

The road passes north east of Madrid to Guadalajara and a junction with the Autovía A-2 and Autopista Radial R-2. The road remains north east of Madrid ending at Torrelaguna and a junction (50 km) of the Autovía A-1 below the towering Sierra de Guadarrama.

References 

N-322
N-322
N-322